Meesalai Veerasingam Maha Vidyalayam ( Mīcālai Vīraciṅkam Makā Vittiyālayam, also known as Meesalai Veerasingam Central College மீசாலை வீரசிங்கம் மத்திய கல்லூரி) is a provincial school in Meesalai, Sri Lanka.

See also
 List of schools in Northern Province, Sri Lanka

References

External links
 

Educational institutions established in 1926
Provincial schools in Sri Lanka
Schools in Jaffna District
1926 establishments in Ceylon